In the Australian Government, the Minister for Sport is currently the Hon Anika Wells, pending the swearing in of the full Albanese ministry on 1 June 2022, following the Australian federal election in 2022. 

In the Government of Australia, the minister administers the portfolio through the Department of Health and Aged Care.

Scope
It was not until the Whitlam Government established the Department of Tourism and Recreation in 1972 that an Australian Government department had specific responsibility for sport. Previously the small amount of sport funding was distributed through ministries such as Health and Foreign Affairs. Frank Stewart, who is regarded as the first minister for sport, commissioned two reports – The role and scope and development of recreation in Australia by John Bloomfield and Report of the Australian Sports Institute Study Group, which highlighted the need for government involvement in sport. The Fraser Government through Bob Ellicott acted upon both reports and established the Australian Institute of Sport in 1981. It was widely reported that this initiative was a direct result of the poor performance of the Australian team at the 1976 Summer Olympics in Montreal, however its genesis preceded that.  The Hawke Government through John Brown further extended Australian Government involvement in sport through the establishment of the Australian Sports Commission in 1985.

List of ministers for sport
The following individuals have been appointed as Minister for Sport, or any of its precedent titles:

List of ministers assisting the Prime Minister for the Sydney 2000 Games
The following individuals have been appointed as Minister Assisting the Prime Minister for the Sydney 2000 Olympic Games:

References

External links
 

Sport
Sport in Australia